The 2021–22 season was the 55th season in existence of Sivasspor and the club's fifth consecutive season in the top flight of Turkish football. In addition to the domestic league, Sivasspor participated in this season's editions of the Turkish Cup and the inaugural campaign of the UEFA Europa Conference League, having entered in the second qualifying round. The season covered the period from July 2021 to 30 June 2022.

Squad

Out on loan

Transfers

In

Loans in

Out

Competitions

Overall record

Süper Lig

League table

Results summary

Results by round

Matches

Turkish Cup

UEFA Europa Conference League

Qualifying rounds

Squad statistics

Appearances and goals

|-
|colspan="14"|Players out on loan:
|-
|colspan="14"|Players who left Sivasspor during the season:

|}

Goal scorers

Clean sheets

Disciplinary Record

Notes

References

External links

Sivasspor seasons
Sivasspor
Sivasspor